Aleix Viladot Caramés (born 26 June 1997) is an Andorran footballer who plays as a defender for Arnedo.

Career

Viladot started his career with Andorran side FC Andorra. In 2018, he joined Marshalltown Community College Tigers in the United States. In 2019, Viladot signed for American club Florida Tropics. In 2020, he joined Texas–Rio Grande Valley Vaqueros in the United States. In 2021, he signed for Spanish team Arnedo.

References

1997 births
Andorran expatriate footballers
Andorran expatriate sportspeople in Spain
Andorran expatriate sportspeople in the United States
Andorran footballers
Association football defenders
Expatriate footballers in Spain
Expatriate soccer players in the United States
FC Andorra players
Living people
Segunda Federación players
USL League Two players
Lakeland Tropics players
Marshalltown Community College alumni
UT Rio Grande Valley Vaqueros men's soccer players
People from Encamp
Andorra international footballers
Andorra youth international footballers
Andorra under-21 international footballers